The 35th Chicago Film Critics Association Awards were announced on December 14, 2022. The awards honor the best in film for 2022. The nominations were announced on December 12, 2022. Everything Everywhere All at Once received the most nominations (12), followed by The Banshees of Inisherin (7) and Aftersun (6).

Winners and nominees
The winners and nominees for the 35th Chicago Film Critics Association Awards are as follows:

Awards

Awards breakdown

The following films received multiple nominations:

The following films received multiple wins:

References

External links
 

2022 film awards
 2022